The 2018–19 Eredivisie Vrouwen is the ninth season of the Netherlands women's professional football league. The season takes place from 7 September 2018 to 3 May 2019 with nine teams. Ajax started the season as defending champions.

Teams 

Source: Soccerway

Format 
At the regular season, the nine teams play each other twice (once at home and once away), for a total of 16 matches each. After that the top five teams qualify for a championship play-off and the bottom four teams play a placement play-off. Teams played each other twice in the championship play-offs group, for a total of 8 matches each while in the placement groups teams play each other three times for a total of 9 matches each. Points accumulated at the regular season are halved and added to the points of the play-off stage rounds. There is no relegation nor promotion in the league and the champion qualifies to the 2019–20 UEFA Women's Champions League.

Regular season

Standings

Results

Play-offs

Championship 
The top five were set after matchday 16. Points of the first stage were halved.

Standings

Results

Placement 
The bottom four were set after matchday 16. Points of the first stage were halved.

Standings

Results

1st and 2nd third

3rd third

References

External links 
 Official website
 Season on soccerway.com

Netherlands
Eredivisie (women) seasons
2018–19 in Dutch women's football